"Out the Blue" is the second single by British DJ and record producer Sub Focus to be released from his second studio album Torus. The song features vocals from English singer Alice Gold. The song was Sub Focus's highest-charting single until the release of "Tidal Wave".

Background and release
Douwma wrote the song in mid-2010 and worked with several vocalists on demo versions of the song. During many DJ sets, including the Ultra Music Festival in 2011, he played a version of the song, featuring a vocoded vocal sample. The demo versions of the song also feature a variation in the melody that was cut out of the final version. Eventually, Alice Gold recorded the version that Douwma would go on to release as a single.

Music video
A music video to accompany the release of "Out the Blue" was first released onto YouTube on 2 April 2012 at a total length of three minutes and twenty-eight seconds.

Track listing

Chart performance

Release history

References

2012 singles
Sub Focus songs
Mercury Records singles
RAM Records singles
2012 songs
Songs written by Bryn Christopher
Songs written by Sub Focus